Mohamed Sobhy may refer to:

Mohamed Sobhy (footballer, born 1981)
Mohamed Sobhy (footballer, born 1999)
Mohamed Sobhi (footballer), born 1992, player for Al-Shamal SC

See also
Mohamed Sobhi (actor), Egyptian actor